The 1975 Cronulla-Sutherland Sharks season was the ninth in the club's history. They competed in the NSWRFL's 1975 Premiership as well as the 1975 Amco Cup.

Ladder

Western Suburbs were stripped of one competition point due to an illegal replacement in one game.

References

Cronulla-Sutherland Sharks seasons
Cronulla-Sutherland Sharks season